Calytrix asperula, commonly known as brush starflower, is a species of plant in the myrtle family Myrtaceae that is endemic to Western Australia.

It blooms between September and January producing cream-yellow star-shaped flowers

Commonly found on flats and amongst granite outcrops along the south coast in the Great Southern and Goldfields-Esperance regions of Western Australia where it grows in sandy soils over laterite or granite.

The species was first described as Calycothrix luteola by the botanist Johannes Conrad Schauer in 1844 in the work Myrtaceae. Plantae Preissianae. George Bentham described the plant in 1867 as Calytrix asperula in the work Orders XLVIII. Myrtaceae- LXII. Compositae in Flora Australiensis.

References

Plants described in 1867
asperula
Flora of Western Australia